NNS Badagry is an Ocea FPB 72 patrol boat operated by the Nigerian Navy.

Design

Operational history

On August 13, 2013, Badagry engaged in a gun battle with pirates who had captured , an oil tanker. The pirates tried to flee, and twelve of the sixteen pirates were killed before the survivors surrendered.

References

Badagry
Ships built in France